This is a list of species recorded on Severnaya Zemlya. Severnaya Zemlya is a  archipelago in the Russian high Arctic. It lies off Siberia's Taymyr Peninsula, separated from the mainland by the Vilkitsky Strait. This archipelago separates two marginal seas of the Arctic Ocean, the Kara Sea in the west and the Laptev Sea in the east.

Flora

Vascular plants

Most common:
 Cerastium sp.
 Papaver polare
 Saxifraga caespitosa
 Saxifraga oppositifolia

Less common:
 Alopecurus alpinus
 Cerastium regelii
 Deschampsia sp.
 draba sp.
 Draba sp.
 Novosieversia glacialis
 Phippsia sp.
 Poa abbreviata
 Poa arctica
 Saxifraga cernua
 Saxifraga nivalis
 Salix polaris
 Stellaria sp.
 Minuartia sp.

Mosses

Most common:
 Detrichum flexicaule
 Dicranum sp.
 Pogonatum sp.
 Sanionia sp.
 Bryum sp.
 Orthothecium chryseum
 Tortura sp.

Less common:
 Andreaea sp.
 Aulacomnium turgidum
 Bryum cryophilum
 Calliergon giganteum
 Calliergon obtusifolium
 Calliergon sarmentosum
 Calliergon giganteum
 Campylophus sp.
 Dichodontium sp.
 Dicranoweisia sp.
 Dicranoweisia crispula
 Dirrichum sp.
 Ditrichum flexicaule
 Drepanocladus revolvens
 Drepanocladus exannulatus
 Hylocomium splendens
 Jungermannia sp.
 Loeskypnum badium
 Philonotis sp.
 Polytrichum sp.
 Ptilidium ciliare
 Racomitrium lanuginosum
 Sanionia uncinata
 Schistidium apocarpum
 Scorpidium turgescens
 Tomenthypnum nitens

Lichens

Most common:
 Cetraria nivalis
 Thamnolia vermicularis
 Cetraria sp.
 Cornicularia sp.
 Lecidea sp.
 Ochrolechia sp.
 Parmelia sp.

Less common:
 Alectoria sp.
 Buellia sp.
 Caloplaca sp.
 Cetaria cucullata
 Cetaria sp.
 Cladia sp.
 Cladonia sp.
 Dactylina arctica
 Dermatocarpon sp.
 Hypogymnia sp.
 Ochrolechia frigida
 Peltigera sp.
 Ramalina sp.
 Rhizocarpon sp.
 Sphaerophorus sp.
 Stereocaulon sp.
 Thamnolia vermicularis
 Thamnolia sp.
 Umbilicaria sp.
 Xanthoria elegans
 Xanthoria sp.

Fauna

Breeding birds
 little auk (Alle alle)
 kittiwake (Rissa tridactyla)
 black guillemot (Cepphus grylle)
 ivory gull (Pagophila eburnea)
 glaucous gull (Larus hyperboreus)
 snow bunting (Plectrophenax nivalis)
 purple sandpiper (Calidris maritima)
 brent goose (Branta bernicla).
 Arctic tern (Sterna paradisaea)
 herring gull (Larus argentatus)
 red-throated diver (Gavia stellata)
 king eider (Somateria spectabilis)
 sanderling (Calidris alba)
 Arctic skua (Stercorarius parasiticus)
 long-tailed skua (Stercorarius longicaudus)
 snowy owl (Bubo scandiacus)

 Lapland bunting (Calcarius lapponicus).
 pomarine skua (Stercorarius pomarinus)
 Ross's gull (Rhodostethia rosea)

Transient birds

 Brünnich's guillemot (Uria lomvia)
 rook (Corvus frugilegus)
 white wagtail (Motacilla alba)
 fulmar (Fulmarus glacialis)
 long-tailed duck (Clangula hyemalis)
 common eider (Somateria mollissima)
 peregrine falcon (Falco peregrinus)
 rock ptarmigan (Lagopus mutus)
 knot (Calidris canutus)
 sharp-tailed sandpiper (Calidris acuminata)
 red phalarope (Phalaropus fulicarius)
 great skua (Catharacta skua)
 Sabine's gull (Xema sabini)

Mammals

 collared lemming (Dicrostonyx torquatus)
 Arctic fox (Alopex lagopus)
 wolf (Canis lupus)
 ermine (Mustela erminea)
 Arctic hare (Lepus timidus)
 reindeer (Rangifer tarandus)
 polar bear (Ursus maritimus)

References

 Bird Observations in Severnaya Zemlya
 Preliminary Results of Botanical and Microbiological Investigations on Severnaya Zemlya 1995

External links

.
.
Severnaya
Biota of Siberia
Krasnoyarsk Krai